Mário Luís Fernandes de Sampaio Mourão (22 September 1924 – 1994) was a Portuguese fencer. He competed in the individual and team épée events at the 1952 Summer Olympics.

References

External links
 

1924 births
1994 deaths
Portuguese male épée fencers
Olympic fencers of Portugal
Fencers at the 1952 Summer Olympics